Ford Amphitheatre may refer to:
MidFlorida Credit Union Amphitheatre, originally Ford Amphitheatre, in Tampa, Florida, U.S.
John Anson Ford Amphitheatre, in Hollywood, California, U.S.
Ford Amphitheater at Coney Island, in Brooklyn, New York, U.S.
Gerald R. Ford Amphitheatre, in Vail, Colorado, U.S., an amphitheatre

See also
Ford Park, a multi-purpose park and arena in Beaumont, Texas, U.S.
Ford Idaho Center, a complex of sports and entertainment venues in Nampa, Idaho, U.S.